Duffryn Rhondda Halt railway station served the area of Duffryn Rhondda, in the historical county of Glamorganshire, Wales, from 1905 to 1966 on the Rhondda and Swansea Bay Railway.

History 
The station was opened on 10 July 1905 by the Rhondda and Swansea Bay Railway, although it opened earlier to miners in 1898 as Duffryn Rhondda Colliery. It opened to the public on 10 July 1905 as Duffryn Rhondda Platform. It was last shown in the timetable on 2 October 1911 but it reappeared in Bradshaw in October 1912 as Duffryn Rhondda Halt. It closed to the public on 3 December 1962 and closed to miners on 7 November 1966.

References 

Disused railway stations in Neath Port Talbot
Railway stations in Great Britain opened in 1905
Railway stations in Great Britain closed in 1962
1898 establishments in Wales
1966 disestablishments in Wales